A damara was a feudal landlord of ancient Kashmir.

Kashmiri society was organised somewhat differently from other areas of India in which Hinduism flourished, this being due to the influence that Buddhism came to have from the time of the reign of Asoka around the third century BC. The more common social and economic demarcation lines of varna - a ritual ranking system comprising Brahmin, Kshatriya, Vaishya and Shudra - became blurred, with the exception of that between the Brahmins and all other Hindus. Instead, it was occupation that formed the primary differentiator and of the occupations it was that of agriculture which was most important.

As landholders and agriculturalists, the damaras were the most important of the occupational classes and their power could be considerable. It was in part as a consequence of their many disputes with the kings of the Lohara dynasty, during a prolonged period of corruption, internecine fighting and misrule, that the region eventually passed into control by Muslim rulers. Mohibul Hassan described that Present day Kashmiri Lone tribe is said to be the descendant of the surviving Damaras.

References

History of Kashmir
 Damara
Ancient landowners